The first Prodi government was the 53rd government of Italy. It held office from 18 May 1996 until 21 October 1998.

Formation
On 21 April 1996, the Olive Tree won 1996 general election in alliance with the Communist Refoundation Party (PRC), making Romano Prodi Prime Minister of Italy. The Olive Tree's main component was the Democratic Party of the Left, which contained the bulk of the former Italian Communist Party. The PDS' Walter Veltroni, who ran in ticket with Prodi in a long electoral campaign, served as Deputy Prime Minister, and 15 other PDS ministers joined him in cabinet alongside 10 PDS junior ministers. It was the first time that (former) Communists had taken part in government since 1947.

Besides the external support of PRC, the coalition received the support also of some minor parties: the Italian Republican Party (PRI, social-liberal), The Network (social-democratic), the South Tyrolean People's Party (regionalist and Christian democratic) and some other minor parties which later merged with PDS.

The average age of the ministers was 55.9 years and 14 ministers has parliamentary experience. The number of female ministers was three.

Fall
The government fell in 1998 when the Communist Refoundation Party withdrew its support. This led to the resignation of Prodi and to the formation of a new government led by Massimo D'Alema as Prime Minister.

Party breakdown
 Independents: Prime minister, 3 ministers and 4 undersecretaries
 Democratic Party of the Left (PDS): 10 ministers and 16 undersecretaries
 Italian People’s Party (PPI): 3 ministers and 11 undersecretaries
 Italian Renewal (RI): 3 ministers and 4 undersecretaries
 Federation of the Greens (FdV): 1 minister and 3 undersecretaries
 Democratic Union (UD): 1 minister and 2 undersecretaries
 Segni Pact (Patto): 2 undersecretaries
 Italian Socialists (SI): 1 undersecretary
 Democratic Alliance (AD): 1 undersecretary
 Movement of Unitarian Communists (MCU): 1 undersecretary
 Republican Left (SR): 1 undersecretary

Composition

References

Sources
Italian Government - Prodi I Cabinet

Italian governments
1996 establishments in Italy
1998 disestablishments in Italy
Cabinets established in 1996
Cabinets disestablished in 1998
Romano Prodi